Now Bandegan Rural District is a rural district (dehestan) in Now Bandegan District, Fasa County, Fars Province, Iran. At the 2006 census, its population was 8,746, in 2,092 families.  The rural district has 26 villages.

References 

Rural Districts of Fars Province
Fasa County